List of Italian dancers in alphabetical order:

A 
Eleonora Abbagnato
Amedeo Amodio
Gasparo Angiolini
Alba Arnova
Alexis Arts
Simona Atzori
Silvia Azzoni

B 
Alice Bellagamba
Alessandra Belloni
Carlo Blasis
Roberto Bolle
Francesca Braggiotti
Gloria Braggiotti Etting
Rossella Brescia
Carlotta Brianza
Amalia Brugnoli

C 
Sara Carlson (American/Italian)
Fabritio Caroso
Raffaella Carrà
Gaetano Casanova
Enrico Cecchetti
Fanny Cerrito
Cosima Coppola
Maria Cumani Quasimodo

D 
Stefano Di Filippo
Simone Di Pasquale
Sara Di Vaira
Domenico da Piacenza
Oriella Dorella
Viviana Durante

F 
Denise Faro
Alessandra Ferri
Carla Fracci

G
Rosina Galli (dancer) (1892-1940) prima ballerina at La Scala Theatre Ballet, Chicago Ballet, as well as the première danseuse of the Metropolitan Opera House
Carlotta Grisi
Fabio Grossi

K 
Kledi Kadiu

L 
Guido Lauri
Pierina Legnani
Don Lurio

M 
Daniela Malusardi
Marisa Maresca
Lorenza Mario
Alessandra Martines
Liliana Merlo

N 
Cesare Negri

P 
Lola Pagnani
Heather Parisi
Giuliana Penzi
Laura Peperara
Samuel Peron
Giovanni Pernice

R 
Renato Rascel
Federica Ridolfi
Carolina Rosati
Giorgio Rossi
Jia Ruskaja
Carmen Russo

S 
Luciana Savignano
Delia Scala
Catherine Spaak

T 
Filippo Taglioni
Maria Taglioni
Alberto Testa
Natalia Titova
Raimondo Todaro

V 
Odette Valery
Ambra Vallo
Auguste Vestris
Gaetano Vestris
Salvatore Viganò

Z 
Virginia Zucchi

 
Lists of entertainers
Lists of dancers